Indiana Jones and the Dance of the Giants is the second of 12 Indiana Jones novels published by Bantam Books. Rob MacGregor, the author of this book, also wrote five of the other Indiana Jones books for Bantam. Published on May 1, 1991, it is preceded by Indiana Jones and the Peril at Delphi and followed by Indiana Jones and the Seven Veils.

Plot summary
The year is 1925 A.D. Dr. Henry Jones Jr., better known as Indiana Jones, has secured his first teaching job as a professor in London University's archaeology department. It is here that Indy first meets a very attractive 20 year old Scottish girl by the name of Deirdre Campbell. She is the brightest student in his class but Indy quickly learns that her knowledge goes far past the contents of his lectures. In her thesis for the class, she quite seriously claims to have uncovered a golden scroll that proves of the true existence of Merlin the sorcerer. Intrigued by the thesis and by Deirdre herself, Indy once again takes up the bullwhip and fedora for an action-packed chase across Britain filled with magic, mystery, murder, a lesson in love and the threat of world domination.

Characters 
Dr. Henry Jones Jr. (a.k.a. Indiana Jones) professor and archaeologist.
Deirdre Campbell Indy's student and the daughter of Dr. Joanna Campbell.
Dr. Joanna Campbell mother of Deirdre Campbell and Indy's boss who invites him on the dig.
Jack Shannon Indy's best friend and roommate, a jazz musician.
Dr. Milford an eccentric old friend to Indy's father and Marcus Brody, who likes to randomly speak Middle English. He is sent by Brody to tell Indy that Omphalos was stolen, but, because of his memory problems, he keeps forgetting what he was supposed to tell him.
Adrian Powell a Member of Parliament, and former associate of both Deidre and Joanna Campbell, who is carrying out a hidden agenda which has almost claimed Indy's life on more than one occasion.
Father Byrne a Catholic priest from Whithorn who has known the Campbell family since before Deidre was born.
Carl  and Richard two brothers, both carpenters and members of the Scottish Amateur Archaeology League hired by Dr. Campbell to assist in the excavation of St. Ninian's Cave, near Whithorn Isle, Scotland.

See also
Indiana Jones (Prequels) - Bantam Books

External links
Indiana Jones Official website

1991 American novels
American adventure novels
Indiana Jones books
Fiction set in 1925
Modern Arthurian fiction